"The Whole World Lost Its Head" is one of three new songs from all-female pop rock/new wave band The Go-Go's 2-disc retrospective Return to the Valley of The Go-Go's. The single only 'bubbled under' on the US charts at #108, but became the band's first and only Top 40 hit in the UK, peaking at #29.

The accompanying music video, directed by Roger Avary, cinematographed by Tom Richmond and edited by Sloane Klevin, was shot in the fall of 1994.

Chart positions

References 

1994 singles
The Go-Go's songs
1994 songs
Songs written by Kathy Valentine
Songs written by Jane Wiedlin
Song recordings produced by Richard Gottehrer
I.R.S. Records singles